Romanus was a Bishop of Poznan, Poland.

He was Bishop from 1012 AD to 1030 AD and is known from the Chronicles of Krakow and he died 1030.

References

Bishops of Poznań
11th-century Polish bishops
Year of birth unknown
10th-century births
1030 deaths